Eugenio Oñate Ibañez de Navarra (Valencia, 28 March 1953), often referred as Eugenio Onãte, is a Spanish engineer who works in computational mechanics.

Books
 Oñate E., Kröplin B., Textile Composites and Inflatable Structures (Computational Methods in Applied Sciences), Springer 2005.
 Oñate E., Owen R., Computational Methods in Applied Sciences, Volume 7: Computational Plasticity, Springer 2007.
 Oñate E., Structural Analysis with the Finite Element Method. Linear Statics, Volume 1: Basis and Solids (Lecture Notes on Numerical Methods in Engineering and Sciences), Springer 2009.
 Oñate E., Structural Analysis with the Finite Element Method. Linear Statics, Volume 2: Beams, Plates and Shells (Lecture Notes on Numerical Methods in Engineering and Sciences), Springer 2010.

External links
 

1953 births
Polytechnic University of Catalonia
Technical University of Valencia alumni
Alumni of Swansea University
Living people